Calophyllum waliense is a species of flowering plant in the Calophyllaceae family. It is found only in Papua New Guinea.
It is threatened by habitat loss.

References

Flora of Papua New Guinea
Endangered plants
waliense
Taxonomy articles created by Polbot